Kragujevački vaterpolo klub Radnički is a men's professional water polo club based in Kragujevac, Serbia. It's a part of the Radnički multi-sports company. As of the 2021–22 season, it competes in the Serbian League, Regional League A1 and LEN Champions League.

Honours

Domestic
Serbian League
Winners (1): 2020–21
Runners-up (4): 2012–13, 2013–14, 2014–15, 2021–22
Serbian Cup 
Winners (3): 2015, 2020, 2022
Runners-up (4): 2014, 2016, 2018, 2021

Regional
Adriatic League
Winners (1): 2020–21

European

LEN Champions League
Runners-up (1): 2013–14
LEN Euro Cup
Winners (1): 2012–13
LEN Super Cup
Runners-up (1): 2013

Season by season

In European competition
Participations in Champions League: 6x
Participations in Euro Cup: 3x

Current squad

External links
 
 

SPD Radnički
Water polo clubs in Serbia
Sport in Kragujevac
2012 establishments in Serbia